Charles Kesteven Saxton  (23 May 1913 – 4 July 2001) was a New Zealand first-class rugby union and cricket player, and a rugby union coach and administrator.

Early life
Born in Kurow, Saxton was educated at Otago Boys' High School in Dunedin, where he was a member of the school's 1st XV rugby team between 1931 and 1932 coached by Jimmy Duncan.

Rugby union career
A halfback, Saxton represented Otago, South Canterbury, and Southland at a provincial level, and was a member of the New Zealand national side, the All Blacks, in 1938. He played seven matches for the All Blacks including three internationals. At the conclusion of World War II he captained the 2nd New Zealand Expeditionary Force "Kiwis" team on their 1945–46 tour of Britain and Europe.

Returning to New Zealand, Saxton coached the Pirates club in Dunedin, and was an assistant coach of the Otago team from 1948 to 1957. In 1967 he managed the All Blacks on their tour of Britain, France and Canada. Saxton served on the council of the New Zealand Rugby Football Union (NZRFU) from 1957 to 1971 and was president of the NZRFU in 1974. He was elected a life member of the NZRFU two years later.

In 1967, Saxton wrote the coaching booklet The ABC of Rugby, which had a print run of 70,000 copies, in conjunction with the NZRFU.

In the 1978 New Year Honours, Saxton was appointed a Member of the Order of the British Empire, for services to rugby.

Cricket career

An opening batsman and occasional wicketkeeper, Saxton played seven first-class games for Otago between the 1934-35 and 1938-39 seasons. He scored 226 runs at an average of 17.38, with a high score of 37.

World War II service
During World War II, Saxton served with the 19th Armoured Regiment, rising to the rank of major and seeing active service in North Africa and Italy.

Later life and death
Saxton owned and ran a menswear shop in Dunedin for many years. He died in Dunedin in 2001 from complications caused by emphysema, and his funeral was held at Carisbrook. In his eulogy, Fred Allen described Saxton as "a New Zealand icon".

See also
 List of Otago representative cricketers

References

External links
 Photograph of Charlie Sexton, 1930s

1913 births
2001 deaths
People educated at Otago Boys' High School
New Zealand rugby union players
New Zealand international rugby union players
Otago rugby union players
South Canterbury rugby union players
Southland rugby union players
Rugby union scrum-halves
New Zealand cricketers
Otago cricketers
New Zealand Members of the Order of the British Empire
New Zealand rugby union coaches
New Zealand Rugby Football Union officials
New Zealand military personnel of World War II
People from Kurow